Israel Rodríguez Calderon (born 27 August 1981) is a Spanish volleyball player, a member of Spain men's national volleyball team and Spanish club CV Almería, 2007 European Champion, a medalist of the European League (gold in 2007, silver in 2009), Spanish Champion (2003, 2004, 2005), Romanian Champion (2014).

Career

Clubs
In November 2015 he joined Polish club PGE Skra Bełchatów for replacement because of Michał Winiarski's injury. He signed a contract until the end of 2015, which was extended to the end of the season. On February 7, 2016, he played with PGE Skra and won the 2016 Polish Cup after beating ZAKSA in the final. In April 2016 he was a member of the same team which won a bronze medal in the 2015–16 PlusLiga championship. After season he left club from Bełchatów

Sporting achievements

Clubs

CEV Champions League
  2007/2008 - with Copra Berni Piacenza

National championships
 2002/2003  Spanish SuperCup 2002, with CV Almería
 2002/2003  Spanish King Cup 2003, with CV Almería
 2002/2003  Spanish Championship, with CV Almería
 2003/2004  Spanish SuperCup 2003, with CV Almería
 2003/2004  Spanish Championship, with CV Almería
 2004/2005  Spanish Championship, with CV Almería
 2006/2007  Spanish SuperCup 2006, with CV Almería
 2006/2007  Spanish King Cup 2007, with CV Almería
 2006/2007  Spanish Championship, with CV Almería
 2007/2008  Italian Championship, with Copra Berni Piacenza
 2013/2014  Romanian Cup, with Tomis Constanța
 2013/2014  Romanian Championship, with Tomis Constanța
 2014/2015  Turkish Championship, with Ziraat Bankası Ankara
 2015/2016  Polish Cup, with PGE Skra Bełchatów
 2015/2016  Polish Championship, with PGE Skra Bełchatów

National team
 2007  European League
 2007  CEV European Championship
 2009  European League

Individually
 2005 CEV European Championship - Best Spiker
 2007 European League - Best Receiver

References

External links
 Israel Rodríguez Calderon at the International Volleyball Federation
 
 Israel Rodriguez at PlusLiga 

1981 births
Living people
Sportspeople from Seville
Spanish men's volleyball players
Spanish expatriate sportspeople in Italy
Expatriate volleyball players in Italy
Spanish expatriate sportspeople in Greece
Expatriate volleyball players in Greece
Spanish expatriate sportspeople in France
Expatriate volleyball players in France
Spanish expatriate sportspeople in Romania
Expatriate volleyball players in Romania
Spanish expatriate sportspeople in Turkey
Expatriate volleyball players in Turkey
Spanish expatriate sportspeople in Poland
Expatriate volleyball players in Poland
Skra Bełchatów players
Mediterranean Games medalists in volleyball
Mediterranean Games silver medalists for Spain
Competitors at the 2009 Mediterranean Games